Saint Damhnade was an Irish virgin who was known for working miracles. She is sometimes confused with Saint Dymphna. Her feast day is 13 June. Very little else is known of her.

Monks of Ramsgate's account

The monks of St Augustine's Abbey, Ramsgate wrote in their Book of Saints (1921),

Butler's account

The hagiographer Alban Butler wrote in his Lives of the Irish Saints (1823),

O'Hanlon's research

John O'Hanlon (1821–1905) in his Lives of the Irish Saints (1875) discusses Saint Damnat or Damhnat, Virgin, of Sliabh Betha (fifth or sixth century).
He notes that the Irish Calendar of the Irish Ordnance Survey says St. Damhnat's festival is on the 13th of June, the Martyrology of Donegal has Damhnat, virgin of Sliabh Betha celebrated on 13 June, and Alban Butler has St. Damhnade on the same date.

Notes

Sources

 

 

Female saints of medieval Ireland